Mansour Helmy is a male Egyptian former international table tennis player.

He won bronze at the 1939 World Table Tennis Championships in the mixed doubles with Gertrude Pritzi.

See also
 List of table tennis players
 List of World Table Tennis Championships medalists

References

Egyptian male table tennis players
World Table Tennis Championships medalists
Year of birth missing (living people)
Living people
Place of birth missing (living people)